Seth Michael Magaziner (born July 22, 1983) is an American investment professional and politician who is the U.S. representative for . He served as the 31st General Treasurer of Rhode Island from 2015 until 2023. A member of the Democratic Party, Magaziner won the November 2022 election to succeed retiring representative James Langevin.

Early life and education
Seth Magaziner was born in Bristol, Rhode Island, on July 22, 1983, to Suzanne and Ira Magaziner. Ira Magaziner is a policy advisor for politicians, governments, and non-governmental organizations. Suzanne is Catholic and Ira is Jewish. Seth is the oldest of three children.

Magaziner graduated from Milton Academy in Milton, Massachusetts, in 2002. He then attended Brown University, where he served as president of the Brown University Democrats, president of the College Democrats of Rhode Island, and as a member of the Brown University Steering Committee on Slavery and Justice. Magaziner graduated from Brown with a Bachelor of Arts in history in 2006. He received a Master of Business Administration from the Yale School of Management in 2010.

Career
Magaziner worked as a school teacher at Creswell Elementary School in Opelousas, Louisiana, from 2006 to 2008, as a Teach For America member. In 2009, he worked as an associate at Point Judith Capital, a Rhode Island-based venture capital firm.

After graduate school, Magaziner worked at Trillium Asset Management as a vice president.

Rhode Island General Treasurer

On October 22, 2013, Magaziner announced his candidacy for Rhode Island General Treasurer. He won the Democratic nomination in the September 9 primary election, defeating former Treasurer Frank Caprio. Magaziner was elected in the November 2014 general election, defeating Independent candidate Ernest A. Almonte.

In his first months in office, Magaziner developed a plan to establish the Rhode Island Infrastructure Bank (RIIB) to finance green infrastructure projects.

In June 2015, Magaziner launched a transparency initiative for the Employees' Retirement System of Rhode Island (ERSRI). In 2015, the treasurer's office announced it was pursuing two class-action lawsuits against fossil fuel industry companies BP and Plains All American for oil spills that allegedly harmed investors and the environment.

In February 2016, Magaziner was selected as chair of the Financial Literacy Committee for the National Association of State Treasurers.

Affiliations
Magaziner serves on the board of directors of Crossroads Rhode Island, a homeless service organization. He previously served on the board of directors of Common Cause Rhode Island.

Magaziner was active in the successful campaign for same-sex marriage in Rhode Island. He served as a board member of Marriage Equality Rhode Island.

U.S. House of Representatives

Elections

2022 

On September 14, 2021, Magaziner announced his candidacy in the 2022 Rhode Island gubernatorial election, focusing on abortion rights, clean energy, reducing gun violence, education, and mandatory coronavirus vaccination for all state and school employees. The incumbent, Dan McKee, had not yet filed for reelection.

On January 26, 2022, Magaziner withdrew from the gubernatorial election and instead announced he would run to represent Rhode Island's 2nd congressional district in the U.S. House of Representatives after longtime incumbent James Langevin announced his retirement. Magaziner was a resident of the 1st congressional district but moved to a rented house in Cranston after his opponents criticized him for not living in the district, though federal law requires a representative only to be a resident of the state. He defeated five other candidates in the September 13 Democratic primary with over 50% of the vote. On November 8, 2022, Magaziner won the general election, defeating Republican nominee Allan Fung, a former mayor of Cranston and two-time Republican nominee for governor.

Tenure

COVID-19 policy 
On January 31, 2023, Magaziner voted against H.R.497:Freedom for Health Care Workers Act, which would lift COVID-19 vaccine mandates for healthcare workers.

On February 1, 2023, Magaziner voted against a resolution to end the COVID-19 national emergency.

Syria 
In 2023, Magaziner voted against H.Con.Res. 21, which directed President Joe Biden to remove U.S. troops from Syria within 180 days.

Voting rights 
On February 9, 2023, Magaziner voted against H.J.Res. 24: Disapproving the action of the District of Columbia Council in approving the Local Resident Voting Rights Amendment Act of 2022, which condemns the District of Columbia’s plan to allow noncitizens to vote in local elections.

Electoral history

Personal life 
Magaziner married Julia McDowell in 2018. The couple has a son.

References

External links

 Congressman Seth Magaziner official U.S. House website
 Seth Magaziner for Congress campaign website

 

|-

|-

1983 births
20th-century American Jews
21st-century American Jews
21st-century American politicians
American business executives
Brown University alumni
Democratic Party members of the United States House of Representatives from Rhode Island
Jewish members of the United States House of Representatives
Living people
Milton Academy alumni
People from Bristol, Rhode Island
Politicians from Providence, Rhode Island
Rhode Island Democrats
State treasurers of Rhode Island
Teach For America alumni
Yale School of Management alumni